HMS Bittern was a  sloop of the Royal Navy. Although the last to be completed she was the name ship of her class, replacing an earlier Bittern which had been re-named before launch. Bittern was laid down on 27 August 1936 by J. Samuel White, of Cowes, Isle of Wight, launched on 14 July 1937 and completed on 15 March 1938.

She served in Home waters and off the coast of Norway during the Second World War.  She took part in the ill-fated Namsos Campaign of 1940, where she was used to defend allied troop ships entering and leaving Namsos harbour from submarine attacks.  The harbour came under regular air attack by the Luftwaffe, and on 30 April, Bittern was spotted by a squadron of Junkers Ju 87 dive bombers.  Bittern came under repeated attack from 0700 hours onwards. She was hit and severely damaged, being set on fire by a bomb dropped from Oberleutnant Elmo Schäfer's aircraft belonging to I./StG 1. Nearby allied ships came alongside and took the survivors off.  When this had been completed, Bittern was sunk by a torpedo from the destroyer .

Notes

References

External links
HMS Bittern at navalhistory.net
HMS Bittern at uboat.net
HMS Bittern at britainsnavy.co.uk
A report on the situation in Namsen Fjord that day 

 

Bittern-class sloops
Sloops of the Royal Navy
World War II escort ships of the United Kingdom
World War II shipwrecks in the Norwegian Sea
1937 ships
Ships sunk by German aircraft
Maritime incidents in April 1940
Scuttled vessels of the United Kingdom